(Swedish for 'the Vasa race') is an annual long distance cross-country ski race held on the first Sunday of March. The  course starts in the village of Berga, just south of Sälen in western Dalarna, Sweden, and ends in the town of Mora in the central part of the province. It is the oldest cross-country ski race in the world, as well as the one with the highest number of participants.

The race was inspired by a notable journey King Gustav Vasa made from Mora to Sälen when he was fleeing from Christian II's soldiers during the winter of 1520–1521 in the beginning of the Swedish War of Liberation. According to legend, he fled on skis. The modern competition started in 1922 and it has been a part of the Worldloppet events since 1979.

Origin 
In 1520, the young nobleman Gustav Ericsson Vasa was fleeing from the troops of Christian II, king of Denmark, Sweden and Norway (the Kalmar Union). Much of the Swedish nobility was in opposition to the king, and had nicknamed him Christian the Tyrant. In a move to silence the opposition, Christian invited the Swedish aristocracy to a reconciliation party in Stockholm, only to have them, including Gustav's parents, massacred in what came to be known as the Stockholm Bloodbath.

Gustav fled through Dalarna, fearing for his life if he were discovered by the king's troops. He spoke to the men of Mora at a gathering and tried to convince them to raise a levy and start a rebellion against King Christian. The men refused to join the rebellion, and Gustav started out west, toward Norway to seek refuge. However, the men in Mora changed their minds after hearing that the Danish rulers had decided to raise taxes, and now they wanted to join the rebellion with Gustav as their leader. They sent out the two best skiers in the county, two brothers from Mora, Lars and Engelbrekt, to search for him and they caught up with him at Sälen. On 6June 1523, Gustav Vasa was crowned King of Sweden, after having defeated the Danish king Christian and dissolved the Kalmar Union. Since that day, Sweden has been an independent nation.

While Gustav traveled from Mora to Sälen, the modern race is run the opposite way, finishing in Mora.

History 

Vasaloppet is the oldest cross-country ski race in the world as well as the one with the highest number of participants. In the past it was also the longest race, until it was surpassed by Pendlerrennet. The idea for the race was published in Westmanlands Läns Tidning on 10February 1922 by Anders Pers from Mora. On 5March 1922, the board of IFK Mora decided to organize a trial race. Newspaper Dagens Nyheter sponsored the race with SEK 1,000 and with finances secured the first race was held on 19March 1922. 136 participants registered for the race and 119 started. The winner was 22-year-old Ernst Alm from Norsjö Sports Club in 7:32:49. He is also the youngest ever winner of the race.

In the 80th race, held on 7March 2004, about 15,500 skiers competed in the main event. More than 40,000 participated in one of the seven different races held during the first week of March. Vasaloppet is one of the races in the long distance cup Ski Classics.

When Swedish Prime Minister Olof Palme was assassinated just two days before the race in 1986, a cancellation of that year's race was considered. However, the race proceeded as planned with the 10,000 participants observing a moment of silence before the start.

Women's participation 

Women winners in Vasaloppet have received awards since 1997. Before that, in 1922–23 and 1981–96, women were allowed to race, but did not receive awards. The first woman to participate was Margit Nordin from Grängesberg in 1923, at 10:09:42. Falu Kuriren wrote about the event: "... an incredible ovation greeted the only lady competitor, Miss Margit Nordin. Miss Nordin was lifted high on strong arms and she received flowers and cheers".

Through the years following the first race, there were many heated debates about women's participation. A majority of officials, mostly male, within sports organizations as well as in society in general, were opposed to women in the race. This led to women being banned from the race from 1924 until 1980. The ban was introduced because it was considered bad for women's health to participate in such a competition. The ban was criticized, especially after 1960. Some defended the ban saying that allowing women would diminish the race's reputation as a tough challenge. Several women did nevertheless participate during the ban, disguised as men. Two of the women who disguised themselves in 1978, Birgitta Westhed and Britt Dohsé, were assisted by professional make-up artist from the Gothenburg City Theatre, who changed their looks using wigs, moustache and a full beard. Westhed was interviewed by TV during the race, which put women's participation higher on the media agenda.

Motto 

The motto of Vasaloppet  ('In [our] fathers' tracks for future victories') is written on a portal erected over the finish line in Mora. At the first race, the finish line was simply marked with white board between two flag poles with the word  ('Finish') on it. The second year a more stately portal with the motto was fashioned. In 1986, the portal was made permanent and has since become a significant landmark in Mora.

Kranskulla and kransmas 
This is a woman who is given the honor of hanging a laurel victory wreath around the neck of the winner of the race as he crosses the finish line. She is dressed in the traditional folk costume of Dalarna. With the introdiction of the women's race, Tjejvasan in 1988, a male  is also appointed.

The race

Organization 
The race is organized by the non-profit organization Vasaloppsföreningen Sälen-Mora that was registered with the Swedish Companies Registration Office in 1992 and is owned by two local sports clubs, IFK Mora and Sälens IF. The organization has approximately 35-year-round employees who work with planning, preparing and developing the events.

Stations 
Traditionally since 1958,  ('bilberry-soup') made by Ekströms food company, is served at the stations along the course. The Swedish word for bilberry, literally means 'blueberry'. About 50,000 liters are served during the Vasaloppet week. In addition, sports drinks and "Vasaloppet buns" are also served. Coffee is served at the Eldris station.

For a number of years, Ekströms had the logo for their  printed on the number tags worn by the participants in the race. The word  was printed in large bold letters, which resulted in the participants being called — a double meaning and pun since the word is also used to describe a "rookie".

Vasaloppet stations

Berga by, 
Smågan, 
Mångsbodarna, 
Risberg, 
Evertsberg, 
Oxberg, 
Hökberg, 
Eldris, 
Mora,

Track profile

The Rope 
The Rope, also referred to as "The Dreaded Rope", is a series of ropes drawn across the track at certain times to prevent participants, who have no chance of reaching the finish line in Mora before the area is closed, to continue. The ropes in Vasaloppet are drawn at seven of the stations: Smågan, Mångsbodarna, Risberg, Evertsberg, Oxberg, Hökberg and Eldris. The race starts at 8:00 a.m. and the finish area is closed at 8:15 p.m. just before the prize ceremony. There is artificial light from Eldris, but skiers should not go in darkness before that place, which also sets a limit for the rope times.

World cup race 
Since 1978, Vasaloppet is included in the Worldloppet Ski Federation, a series of long-distance cross-country skiing races. In 2006, the Vasaloppet was included in the FIS Cross-Country World Cup; a large complement of World Cup racers joined the men's field for the full  distance. Owing to the distance— longer than the longest race usually skied in the World Cup—as well as the proximity to the just-concluded Olympic Games in Turin, the race was again dominated by long-distance specialists rather than World Cup racers. Daniel Tynell won the race, just ahead of Jerry Ahrlin, while Anders Aukland – who has skied on both the Norwegian national World Cup team and in marathons like the Vasaloppet – finished third. The women's World Cup Vasaloppet was held over  the previous day, rather than being integrated with the full Vasaloppet. Marit Bjørgen from Norway won, though the field included only World Cup racers, since the marathon specialists chose to race in the full-distance event the next day.

Vasaloppet week 

The week preceding Vasaloppet is known as Vasaloppet week. Races held during this week include:
 Kortvasan (short – )
 Tjejvasan (ladies – )
 Halvvasan (half – )
 Ungdomsvasan (9–16 years old – )
 Öppet spår (non-competitive – )
 Stafettvasan (relay – )
 Nattvasan (two-person teams make the original race at night in darkness – )
 Vasaloppet (original – )

Statistics

Multiple winners 
Men

Nils 'Mora-Nisse' Karlsson has the most titles, with 9. Janne Stefansson (7), Jan Ottosson (4), Arthur Häggblad (4), Bengt Hassis (3), Oskar Svärd (3), Daniel Tynell, Jörgen Brink (3) and John Kristian Dahl (3) are the only other racers with more than two titles. Six men have two titles.

Women

Sofia Lind has the most titles, with 4. Four women have two titles.

Time 
The average winning time is 5:11:38 (a per-kilometer average of 3:28). The record winning time is 3:28:18 (2:19 per kilometer), set by Tord Asle Gjerdalen of Norway in 2021. Only 11 winners have finished in less than four hours.

Konrad Hallenbarter from Switzerland, is the first to win a Vasaloppet under four hours,3:58:08, in 1983.

The ten fastest times include six Swedes and four Norwegians; Jörgen Brink, Sweden appear twice in the list of the ten fastest times. Of the ten fastest times, one occurred in the 1980s, two in the 1990s, two in the 2000s, four in the 2010s and one in the 2020s.

In 2021 course records were set for both men and women. Before that the fastest year was 2012, also with course records for both men and women.

Ten fastest times
 2021: Tord Asle Gjerdalen (NOR) - 3:28:18
 2023: Emil Persson (SWE) - 3:37:43
 2012: Jörgen Brink (SWE) – 3:38:41
 1998: Peter Göransson (SWE) – 3:38:57
 2004: Anders Aukland (NOR) – 3:48:42
 1986: Bengt Hassis (SWE) – 3:48:55
 2013: Jørgen Aukland (NOR) – 3:50:49
 2005: Oskar Svärd (SWE) – 3:51:47
 2011: Jörgen Brink (SWE) – 3:51:51
 1992: Jan Ottosson (SWE) – 3:57:04

Average times 
Average times per decade have declined in each ten-year span, with the sharpest drop between decade averages occurring in the 1960s, for which the average winning time was 31:45 faster than the average winning time of the 1950s. The average winning time in the 1970s was 16:07 faster than the 1960s, the 1980s average was 24:09 faster than the 1970s, and the 1990s average was 13:06 faster than the 1980s. The average winning time in the 2000s is only 2:18 faster than the 1990s, however. As of 2011 the average winning time so far in the 2010s is 12:12 faster than the 2000s.

Winners' nationalities 
Sweden is the most prolific producer of winners, with 74 titles (including two all-Sweden ties, in 1928 and 1988), or 90% of the 82 contested races. (The race was canceled in 1932, 1934, and 1990). Norway has produced seven winners: Ole Ellefsæter, 1971; Anders Aukland, 2004; Jørgen Aukland, 2008 and 2013; John Kristian Dahl, 2014, 2016 and 2017, Petter Eliassen, 2015, Andreas Nygaard, 2018,Tore Björseth Berdal, 2019. Two countries have produced two winners: Finland (Pekka Kuvaja, 1954; Pauli Siitonen, 1973) and Austria (Walter Mayer, 1980; Mikhail Botvinov, 1997). Five countries have produced one winner: East Germany (Gert-Dietmar Klause, 1975), the Soviet Union (Ivan Garanin, 1977), France (Jean-Paul Pierrat, 1978), Switzerland (Konrad Hallenbarter, 1983), and Estonia (Raul Olle, 2000).

Sweden won every race until 1954, when Pekka Kuvaja of Finland won the race. The next non-Swede to win was Ole Ellefsæter of Norway (1971), who kicked off a decade in which Sweden won just five titles and racers from five other countries won the five other titles. Sweden won 8 of the titles in the 1980s (Austria [Mayer, 1980] and Switzerland [Hallenbarter, 1983] each won one title in that decade), and 8 more in the 1990s (Austria won one more title in that decade [Botvinov, 1997], and the race was canceled once [1990]). In the 2000s, Sweden won seven races, Norway won twice (Anders Aukland, 2004; Jørgen Aukland, 2008), and Estonia won once (Olle, 2000).

Winners

Men

Women

Sister races 
Vasaloppet USA, held annually on the second Saturday of February in Mora, Minnesota, USA (prior to 2015, the race occurred annually on the second Sunday of February)
Vasaloppet Japan, held in Asahikawa, Hokkaido, since 1981
Chinese Vasaloppet, held in Changchun since 2003
Botniavasan, Finland, since 2006
Vasaloppet de la Sergerie, Jonquière, Quebec, Canada, since 2007
, summer cycling race using the Vasaloppet course.

Notable participants 

Vasaloppet has been called a rite of passage for Swedes. Aside from the winners, some of the noted people who have completed the race are:

See also 
 Finlandia-hiihto
 List of Swedish sportspeople
 Skiing
 Tjejvasan
 Tourism in Sweden

References

External links 

 Vasa That! – A participant's story
 Vasaloppet USA Website
 3D animation of race – Google Earth software required
 Vasaloppet 2013 photos
 The event at SVT's Open Archive 

International sports competitions hosted by Sweden
Recurring sporting events established in 1922
1922 establishments in Sweden
Swedish Classic Circuit
March sporting events
Cross-country skiing competitions in Sweden
Sport in Mora, Sweden
Sports competitions in Dalarna County
Ski marathons
Gustav I of Sweden